Mississauga—Brampton South was a provincial electoral district in Ontario, Canada, that has been represented in the Legislative Assembly of Ontario from the 2007 provincial election until 2018.  It was dissolved into Mississauga—Malton, Mississauga—Streetsville, Mississauga East—Cooksville, Mississauga Centre, Brampton South and Brampton Centre.

Geography
It consisted of the parts of the cities of Mississauga and Brampton bounded by a line drawn from the intersection of Highway 401 with the northeastern limit of the City of Mississauga, south along the city limit, southwest along Burnhamthorpe Road East, northwest along Central Parkway East, southwest along Highway 403, northwest along Mavis Road; thence northwesterly along said road to Eglinton Avenue West; thence southwesterly along said avenue to Terry Fox Way; thence northwesterly along said way to Britannia Road West; thence northeasterly along said road to Mavis Road, southwest along Highway 401, northwest along Mississauga Road, northeast along the northwestern limit of the City of Mississauga, northwest along McLaughlin Road, northeast along Steeles Avenue East, southeast along Kennedy Road South, northeast along the northwestern limit of the City of Mississauga, southeast along Dixie Road, and northeast along Highway 401 to the point of commencement.

History

It was created in 2003 from Bramalea—Gore—Malton—Springdale, Brampton West—Mississauga, Mississauga Centre and Mississauga East ridings. In the  2011 provincial election, it had the lowest turnout of any riding in the province.

Members of Provincial Parliament

Election results

2007 electoral reform referendum

Sources

Elections Ontario Past Election Results

Former provincial electoral districts of Ontario
Politics of Brampton
Politics of Mississauga